Isaac Hlatshwayo (born 4 October 1977) is a South African former professional boxer who competed from 2000 to 2013. He held the IBF welterweight title in 2009, and the IBO lightweight and welterweight titles between 2005 and 2008.

Professional career

Hlatshwayo won the vacant IBF welterweight title against Delvin Rodríguez from the Dominican Republic on 1 August 2009. He lost the title to Jan Zaveck on 11 December 2009.

Professional boxing record

References

External links

1977 births
Welterweight boxers
Living people
Sportspeople from Soweto
South African male boxers